Zinc finger and BTB domain containing 43 is a protein that in humans is encoded by the ZBTB43 gene.

References

External links 
 PDBe-KB provides an overview of all the structure information available in the PDB for Human Zinc finger and BTB domain-containing protein 43

Further reading 

Human proteins